Atum: A Rock Opera in Three Acts is the twelfth studio album by American rock band the Smashing Pumpkins. The album will be released in three separate installments of 11 songs—Atum: Act One was released on November 15, 2022, Atum: Act Two was released on January 31, 2023, and Atum: Act Three is scheduled for April 21, 2023. A physical box set consisting of all 33 songs, along with a group of 10 additional exclusive songs, is also scheduled for release on April 21.

Background
Frontman Billy Corgan first announced his plans to release a "sequel" concept album to Mellon Collie and the Infinite Sadness (1995) and Machina/The Machines of God (2000) in October 2020, shortly prior to the release of the band's eleventh studio album Cyr in November 2020. Corgan had wanted to do it as early as 2017 or 2018, but with everything going on with the band at the time, including guitarist James Iha being back in the band for the first time in 18 years, and plotting a large tour around 3/4 of the original band being together again, he instead opted on the less-ambitious 8 song album Shiny and Oh So Bright (2018). When the COVID-19 pandemic broke out years later and cancelled much of the band's planned touring, Corgan found himself with a lot of time on his hands and decided to revisit the concept. The album was recorded over a span of 2 years, some of it concurrently with Cyr.

Concept and structure 
Atum is a concept album that Corgan describes as a sequel to the band's Mellon Collie and the Infinite Sadness and Machina/The Machines of God. The album tells the story of the same character followed in the prior two albums ("Zero" and "Glass") respectively, with the character now being much older than portrayed in the prior albums, and now known as "Shiny". Similar to the prior albums, the story is described by Corgan as having "...one foot in reality and one foot in a made up world... It’s based on a lot of autobiographical things. But there’s lots of things that are things I’m just interested in exploring that don’t necessarily have anything to do with me."

Atum (pronounced the same as Autumn) will release in three main parts, called "Act 1, Act 2, and Act 3". Each act will consist of 11 songs, and each act will release 11 weeks after the prior. Concurrent to the third act releasing, a physical box set containing all 33 songs, and an additional 10 extra songs, will also be released. The release schedule was designed by Corgan to help listeners pace themselves in digesting the large body of work.

Sound
Contrary to Cyr'''s electronic and guitar-light sound, Corgan described Atum as more guitar-driven in its sound. He describes the sound as going "into a million different directions", noting that around a third of the album is "heavy", a third of it sounds "kind of more similar to what [the band has] been doing recently", and a third of it sounds more "esoteric" in advancing the concept/musical aspects of the album.

Release and promotion
The album's title and three part release structure was announced on September 19, 2022. The album's first single, "Beguiled", was released the following day. Corgan will also conduct a weekly podcast called Thirty Three, where he will play and dissect a new song each week prior to release. Atum: Act One was released on November 15, 2022, Atum: Act Two was released on January 31, 2023, and Atum: Act Three is scheduled for April 21, 2023. A physical box-set, consisting of all 33 songs, along with a group of 10 additional exclusive songs, is also scheduled for release on April 21.  The ten additional songs, which will be spread across five 7-inch singles, were revealed in the fourth episode of Corgan's Thirty-Three podcast to be the shelved Shiny and Oh So Bright Vol. 3'' album.  The band embarked on the Spirits on Fire tour across North America with Jane's Addiction and Poppy leading up to the album's first release, with Our Lady Peace filling in on select Canadian dates for Jane's Addiction, and Meg Myers doing the same for Poppy.

Track listing

Personnel

The Smashing Pumpkins
 Billy Corgan – vocals, guitar, bass guitar, keyboards
 James Iha – guitar
 Jeff Schroeder – guitar
 Jimmy Chamberlin – drums

Additional musicians
 Katie Cole – backing vocals
 Mike Garson – piano on "Atum"
 Sierra Swan – backing vocals

References

2022 albums
2023 albums
Albums produced by Billy Corgan
Rock operas
Sumerian Records albums
The Smashing Pumpkins albums